Parbatia Banal Panditayan (English translation - Parbatia turns into a panditayan) is a 1986 Bhojpuri film directed by Ramnath Roy and produced by Sheetla Prasad Agrahari under the banner of Rajwanta Films. The film stars Girija Mitra, Shiv Agrahari, Laxmi Chhaya, Chandrakala, Kalpana Pandit and Naseem Banu. It had music by Pratibha Dutt, lyrics by Ramnath Roy and songs sung by Usha Mangeshkar, Mahendra Kapoor, Anuradha Paudwal and Dilbar Khan.

Plot 
It is a romantic cum drama-based film, which is the story about a girl named Parbatia (played by Girija Mitra) who falls in love with Kishan Pandit, a police officer, played by Shiv Agrahari, but they both belong to a different section of society. Kishan fights for his love and gets married to her (Parbatia). The climax of the film deals with a twist related to the hidden truth of Parbatia's past life.

Cast 
 Girija Mitra
 Shiv Agrahari
 Laxmi Chhaya
 Chandrakala
 Liaqat Ali
 Kalpana Pandit
 Sheetla Prasad Agrahari
 Naseem Banu
 Vandna Shashtri
 Hari Shukla

Soundtrack

Parbatiya Banal Panditayan has music by Prativa Dutta, with lyrics by Ramnath Roy. The songs were sung by Usha Mangeshkar, Mahendra Kapoor, Dilbar Khan, Anuradha Paudwal and Prativa Dutta.

See also
Bhojpuri Film Industry
List of Bhojpuri films

References

External links

1986 films
1980s Bhojpuri-language films